Madrid Atocha, also named Madrid Puerta de Atocha–Almudena Grandes, is the first major railway station in Madrid. It is the largest station serving commuter trains (Cercanías), regional trains from the south and southeast, intercity trains from Navarre, Cádiz and Huelva (Andalusia) and La Rioja, and the AVE high speed trains from Girona, Tarragona and Barcelona (Catalonia), Huesca and Zaragoza (Aragon), Sevilla, Córdoba, Málaga and Granada (Andalusia), Valencia, Castellón and Alicante (Levante Region). These train services are run by Spain's national rail company, Renfe. As of 2019, this station has daily services to Marseille, France.

Overview
The station is in the Atocha neighborhood of the district of Arganzuela. The original façade faces Plaza del Emperador Carlos V, a site at which a variety of streets converge, including the Calle de Atocha, Paseo del Prado, Paseo de la Infanta Isabel, Avenida de la Ciudad de Barcelona, Calle de Méndez Álvaro, Paseo de las Delicias, Paseo de Santa María de la Cabeza, and Ronda de Atocha.

Atocha station is a railway complex, formed by the Madrid Atocha Cercanías and Madrid Puerta de Atocha stations of Spain's national railways and a station of the Madrid underground called Atocha-Renfe. Renfe is the state-owned company which operates freight and passenger trains since 1941.

History

At this site, Madrid's first railway station was inaugurated on 9 February 1851 under the name Estación de Mediodía (Atocha-Mediodía is now the name of an area of the Arganzuela district, and means south in old Spanish).

After the building was largely destroyed by fire, it was rebuilt by the MZA railway company and reopened in 1892. The architect for the replacement, in a wrought iron renewal style was Alberto de Palacio Elissagne, who collaborated with Gustave Eiffel. Engineer Henry Saint James also took part in the project. The name Atocha has become attached to the station because of the nearby basilica dedicated to Our Lady of Atocha. The train platforms were partly covered by a roof in the form of inverted hull with a height of approximately 27 meters and length of 157 meters. The steel and glass roof spreads between two brick flanking buildings.

This complex of railway tracks expanded through the years. In 1985, a project of complete remodeling began, based on designs by Rafael Moneo. In 1992, the original building was taken out of service as a terminal, and converted into a concourse with shops, cafés, and a nightclub. Like the Orsay Museum in Paris, the concourse has been given a new function, that being in the case of Atocha a stunning  covered tropical garden.

A modern terminal was also designed by Moneo, and built in adjacent land to serve both the new High Speed trains, regional and local commuter lines. The main lines end in the new terminal; regional and commuter train platforms are located underground, at the ingress to a rail tunnel extending northward under the Paseo de la Castellana. The station is served by two Madrid Metro stations, Estación del Arte (located near the Museo Reina Sofía) and the Atocha Renfe metro station. The latter was added when the new terminal building was constructed and is directly linked to the railway station, providing access to Line 1. A connection to Line 11 will be constructed in the first half of the 2020s, with work scheduled to begin in November 2022 for completion by the end of 2026.

On 19 December 2021, the regional government of the Community of Madrid announced that Atocha Renfe station would be renamed "Atocha", owing to the liberalization of Spain's railway industry and the entry of new rail companies into the Spanish market. The station was originally set to be renamed "Atocha-Constitución del 78" (Atocha-Constitution of '78), announced by Vice President Ignacio Aguado on 16 February 2021, and proposed by Citizens (Cs), his political party, but was halted after Cs lost all its seats in the Assembly of Madrid in the aftermath of the 2021 Madrilenian regional election. The name change, which entailed replacing signage, updating maps and modifying station announcements, took effect on 1 February 2022. The following month on 3 March 2022 the Spanish central government announced a second name change to rename Puerta de Atocha after writer Almudena Grandes, who died four months earlier, with the name change taking effect on 19 November 2022.

2004 Madrid train bombings

On 11 March 2004, packed arriving commuter trains were bombed in a series of coordinated attacks, killing 193 people and wounding 1,800. The official investigation by the Spanish Judiciary determined the attacks were directed by a Islamist terrorist cell.

Memorials to the 2004 attack

On 10 June 2004, a somber and minimalist Atocha station memorial was dedicated to the victims of the attack. The monument includes a virtual shrine. Visitors to the attacked stations can leave a hand silhouette and a message through special-purpose consoles. This monument is made up of 192 olive and cypress trees, one for each person who died on that day, with a tree also planted in remembrance of the police officer, who died on 3 April 2004. He died as a result of a suicide bomb during the attempt to capture a number of the perpetrators, four of whom were killed by the bomb. The forest is surrounded by a stream, with water as a symbol of life.

Services

Trains from Puerta de Atocha

Trains from Atocha–Cercanías

Suburban trains

See also
1977 Atocha massacre

References

External links

Atocha at Google Maps
Madrid train services visitor guide (English)
11-M memorial website (in Spanish)
Renfe.com

Line 1 (Madrid Metro) stations
Madrid–Barcelona high-speed rail line
Railway stations in the Community of Madrid
Railway stations in Madrid
Railway stations opened in 1851
Cercanías Madrid stations
Rafael Moneo buildings
1851 establishments in Spain
Railway stations in Spain opened in 1851
Transit centers in Spain